This is a list of compositions by Franco Donatoni.

The list 
Quartet No. 1, for string quartet (1950)
Concerto for Orchestra (1951)
Il libro dei Sette Sigilli, biblical cantata for soli, horn and orchestra (1951)
Recitativo e allegro for violin and piano (1951)
Concertino, for 2 horns, 2 trumpets, 2 trombones, 4 timpani and archi (1952)
Concerto, for bassoon and orchestra (1952)
Sonata, for viola solo (1952)
Ouverture, for chamber orchestra (1953)
Symphony, for string orchestra (1953)
Cinque pezzi, for 2 pianos (1954)
Divertimento, for violino e gruppo strumentale (1954)
Musica, for chamber orchestra (1955)
Composizione in quattro movimenti for piano (1955)
La lampara, ballet (1957)
Tre improvvisazioni for piano (1957)
Quartet No. 2, for string quartet (1958)
Movimento, for harpsichord, piano, and 9 instruments (1959)
Serenata, for female voice and 16 instruments, text from Dylan Thomas (1959)
Strophes, for orchestra (1959)
For Grilly ("improvvisazione per sette" [improvisation for seven]), for 7 performers (1960) 
Sezioni ("Invenzione per orchestra" [inventions for orchestra]) (1960)
Doubles, for harpsichord (1961)
Puppenspiel I, ("Studi per una musica di scena" [studies for theatrical music]) for orchestra (1961)
Quartet No. 3, for four-channel tape (1961)
Per orchestra (1962)
Quartet No. 4 (Zrcadlo), for string quartet (1963)
Asar, for 10 string instruments (1964)
Babai, for harpsichord (1964)
Black and white, for 37 string instruments (1964)
Divertimento No. 2, for strings (1965)
Puppenspiel II, for flute and orchestra (1966)
Etwas ruhiger im Ausdruck, for flute, clarinet, violin, violoncello, and piano (1967)
Souvenir ("Kammersymphonie op. 18" [Chamber Symphony op. 18]), for 15 musical instruments (1967)
Black and white II "Esercizi per le dieci dita" [Exercises for the Ten Fingers] for keyboard instruments (1968)
Estratto for piano (1969)
Orts ("Souvenir n. 2"), for 14 instruments and narrator ad libitum (1969)
Solo, for string orchestra (1969)
Doubles II, for orchestra (1970)
To Earle, for chamber orchestra (1970)
Secondo estratto, for harp, harpsichord, and piano (1970)
To Earle Two, for orchestra and instruments (1971)
Lied, for 13 instruments (1972)
Jeux pour deux, for harpsichord and positive organ (1973)
Voci–Orchesterübung, for orchestra (1973)
Espressivo, for oboe and orchestra (1974)
Quarto estratto, for 8 instruments (1974)
Duetto, for harpsichord (1975)
Duo pour Bruno, for orchestra (1975)
Lumen, for 6 strumenti (1975)
Terzo estratto, for piano and 8 instruments (1975)
Ash, for 8 instruments (1976)
Musette per Lothar, for musette (1976) 
Algo, for guitar (1977) (Written for Ruggero Chiesa and Oscar Ghiglia)
Ali, 2 Pieces for viola solo (1977)
Diario 76, for 4 trumpets and 4 trombones (1977) 
Portrait, for harpsichord and orchestra (1977)
Spiri, for 10 instruments (1977)
Toy, for 2 violins, viola, and harpsichord (1977)
Arie, for female voice and orchestra, texts by Omar Khayyam, Renato Maestri, Fray Luis de León, Tiziana Fumagalli, Hafiz (1978)
De Près, for female voice, 2 piccolos and 3 violins (1978)
Ed insieme bussarono, for female voice and piano (1978)
About..., for violin, viola, and guitar (1979)
Argot, for violin (1979)
Marches, for harp (1979)
Nidi, for piccolo (1979)
Clair, for clarinet (1980)
L'ultima sera, for female voice and 5 instruments, text by Fernando Pessoa (1980) 
Le ruisseau sur l'escalier, for violoncello and 19 performers (1980)
The Heart's Eye, for string quartet (1980)
Fili, for flute and piano (1981)
Small, for piccolo, clarinet, and harp (1981)
Tema, for 12 instruments (1981)
Feria, for 5 flutes, 5 trumpets an organ (1982)
Lame, for violoncello (1982) 
In cauda (in three movements), for choir and orchestra (1982–1986),
Abyss, for low female voice, bass flauto in C, and 10 instruments, text by Susan Park (1983),
Ala, for violoncello and contrabass (1983),
Alamari for violoncello, contrabass, and piano (1983), 
Diario '83 for 4 trumpets, 4 trombones,  and orchestra (1983)
Lem, for contrabass (1983)
Rima, for piano (1983)
She for 3 soprani and 6 instruments, text by Susan Park (1983)
Symphony, op. 63 ("Anton Webern"), for chamber orchestra (1983)
Françoise Variationen, for piano (1983–1996), 
Atem, opera in two movements and an intermezzo, text by Brandolino Brandolini d'Adda, Tiziana Fumagalli, Renato Maestri, and Susan Park (1984)
Cadeau, for 11 performers (1984)
Darkness for 6 percussionisti (1984)
Ombra for contrabass clarinet (1984)
Ronda for violino, viola, violoncello, and piano (1984)
Omar for vibrafono (1985)
Sextet, for 2 violins, 2 violas, and 2 violoncellos (1985)
Still for soprano leggero e 6 strumenti (1985)
Eco for orchestra da camera (1985–1986)
Arpège, for 6 instruments (1986) 
Refrain, for 8 instruments (1986)
Ave, for piccolo, glockenspiel, and celesta (1987) 
Flag, for 13 instruments (1987)
O si ride for 12 solo voices, text by Brandolino Brandolini D'Adda (1987)
A Françoise, for piano (1988)
Cinis, for female voice and bass clarinet, testo di Gaio Licinio Calvo (1988)
La souris sans sourire, for string quarteti (1988) 
Short, for trumpet in C (1988),
Cloches, for 2 pianos, 8 wind instruments, and 2 percussionists (1988–1989) 
Blow, for wind quintet (1989)
Ciglio for violin (1989)
Frain, for 8 instruments (1989)
Hot for sopranino or tenor saxophone and 6 performers (1989)
Midi, for flute (1989)
Soft, for bass clarinet (1989)
Ase (Algo II), for female voice and guitar (1990)
Bok, for bass clarinet and marimba (1990)
Chantal, for solo harp, flute, clarinet, and string quartet (1990)
Cloches II, for 2 pianos (1990)
Het, for flute, bass clarinet, and piano (1990)
Holly, for cor anglais, oboe, oboe d'amour, and 13 instruments (1990)
Marches II for solo harp, 3 female voices ad libitum, 12 instruments, and 3 percussionists (1990)
Rasch, for 4 saxophones (1990)
Spice (Ronda n. 2) for violino/viola, clarinet in B-flat/E-flat clarinet, violoncello, and piano (1990) 
Cloches III, for 2 pianos e 2 percussionisti (1991),
Madrigale, for 4 choirs of white voices and 4 percussionists, text by Elsa Morante (1991)
Refrain II, for 11 performers (1991)
Aahiel, for mezzo-soprano, clarinet, vibraphone, marimba, and piano, anonymous text (1992)
An Angel within my Heart for female voice, 2 clarinets, and string trio, text by Susan Park (1992)
Concerto Grosso, for orchestra and 5 electronic keyboards (1992)
Feria II, for organ (1992),
Feria III, for organ (1992)
Jay, for piano, 2 trumpets, 3 horns, and 2 trombones (1992)
Late in the Day (Ronda n. 3), for soprano, flute, clarinet, and piano, text by Michael Riviere (1992)
Mari for marimba (1992)
Mari II for 4 marimbas (1992)
Nidi II, for tenor recorder (1992)
Scaglie, for trombone (1992)
Sincronie, for piano with accompaniment of a solo violoncello (1992)
Sweet, for tenor recorder (1992)
Algo II, for 2 guitars (1993)
Ciglio II, for violine and flute (1993)
Concertino No. 2, for 5 electronic keyboards (1993)
Refrain III, for 14 performers (1993)
Small II, for flute, viola, and harp (1993)
Sweet Basil, for trombone and big band (1993)
In cauda II, for orchestra (1993–1994)
Ciglio III, for violin and piano (1994)
Flans, per coloratura soprano and 9 instruments, text by François Villon (1994)
Portal, for clarinet in B-flat, bass clarinet, E-flat clarinet, and orchestra (1994) 
Puppenspiel III for piccolo, flute, alto flute in G, and 14 performers (1994)
Serenata II for 5 instruments (1994)
Sincronie II for violoncello, piano, and 7 instruments (1994)
Alfred, Alfred opera in seven scenes and six intermezzi, text by the composer (1995)
Algo III for guitar and 23 performers (1995)
Cinis II, for bass clarinet, marimba and percussion (1995),
Duet No. 2, for 2 violins (1995)
Fanfara, for brass (1995)
Incisi, for oboe (1995)
Luci, for flute in G (1995)
Rasch II for 4 saxophones, vibraphone, marimba, percussion, and piano (1995)
Triplum, for flute, oboe, and clarinet (1995)
Algo IV for 13 instruments (1996)
In cauda III, for orchestra (1996)
Lame II, for 8 violoncellos (1996)
Lem II, for contrabass and 15 instruments (1996)
Luci II, for bassoon and horn (1996)
Refrain IV, for 8 strumenti (1996)
Till, for corno (1996)
Leoncavallo, for piano (1996)
Al, for mandolin, mandola, and guitar (1997)
Che, for tuba (1997)
Feria IV, for accordion (1997)
Luci III, for string quartet (1997)
Tell, for cor anglais (1997)
Cerocchi 70 for clarinet, violoncello, and piano (1998)
Elly, for clarinet, violoncello, and piano (1998)
Fire (In cauda IV), for 4 female voices and orchestra, text by Jack Beeching (1998)
Poll, for 13 performers (1998)
Clair II, for clarinet (1999)
Prom, for orchestra (1999)
ESA (In cauda V), for orchestra (2000)

Donatoni, Franco